The Mount Druitt Town Rangers, or Mt Druitt Rangers, are a football (soccer) club from Mt Druitt Blacktown in Western Sydney, Australia. The club was incorporated in 1970. The team currently plays in the New South Wales National Premier Leagues 1, the highest league in the state and second highest in the country after the A-League. Winning promoted having won the Club Championship in 2018 season from NSW NPL2.

History
The Mt Druitt Town Rangers Soccer Club was incorporated in 1970 and has developed a strong association with the district and the states governing body, Football NSW.

Since 1970, the Rangers has provided football opportunities for the youth of Western Sydney. Founded by two Scots of opposing religions and the fiercest of football rivalries, they overcame their differences to unite the green of Celtic, the Rangers name, and the gold of Australia - their new home.

Sadie and Jackie Wilson (Celtic) and Joseph Martin (Rangers) kicked it off in the late 1960s. Jackie somewhat reluctant at first ended up door knocking the local streets where many Scottish expats had settled, quickly the club gathered a strong base that built the foundations of the club we have today. Over the years many cultural backgrounds have been welcomed to Popondetta irrespective of their race, colour or creed. In 2012 Rangers first entered the FNSW Girls program.

The Rangers play in the FFA FNSW National Premier League (NPL) 1st Grade, 20s, FNSW League One u18s, u16s, 15s, 14s, 13s, Skills Acquisition League u12s, 11s, 10s, 9s and FNSW League One Women’s 1st, Res and FNSW League Two Girl's 16g, 15g, 14g. MDTRFC also have an Inclusive /Special Needs/ AWD program. Town Rangers also offers community football opportunities in the local Blacktown District Soccer Football Association.

The Rangers regularly feature in the highly respected invitational Portuguese International Tournament hosted by Vila Franca do Rosario (2014,16,17,19). Over the years vFR has included some of the superpowers of European football's youth academies such as regulars Sporting Club Portugal, SL Benfica, Porto FC, as well as other international guests Sheffield Wednesday, Real Betis, Malaga, Dynamo Moscow. In 2017, the Skills Acquisition Program also toured Portugal and played in the Algarve New World Youth Cup, where the Rangers team was awarded the Fair Play Award. That same year, the Rangers made the National Premier League 2 1st grade grand final against the league winners and highly respected Marconi.

In 2016, Blacktown City Council announced a major upgrade to the Popondetta Park precinct of $5 million including the development of a synthetic field and additional amenities for players and spectators. This will commence in 2022.

FFA Cup: Rangers have successfully won though to the Round of 32 FFA Cup Finals in both 2019, 2020 (COVID abandoned) and 2021. With over 700 clubs entering each year  the FFA Cup is the largest participation tournament in Australia.

Club colours and kit
The club's home kit is based on the Australian national jersey/shirt is predominantly gold and shorts bottle green, the socks are gold. The away kit is shirt bottle green, shorts black, and socks black.

Current squad
''As of December 2022"

Honours
 2018  National Premier Leagues NPL2 - Winners.
 2018  NPL2 Senior Club Champions.
 2015  NPL2 Youth Club Champions
 2014 and 2013 Boys Youth Club Champions

References

External links
 Mount Druitt Rangers home page
 Facebook /mdtrfc Official Site

Soccer clubs in Sydney
Association football clubs established in 1970
1970 establishments in Australia